Dan Starkey may refer to:

 Dan Starkey (series), a novel series by Colin Bateman
 Dan Starkey (actor), an actor who appears in Doctor Who episodes

See also
Daniel Starkey (disambiguation)

Starkey, Dan